Metalloreductase STEAP2 is an enzyme that in humans is encoded by the STEAP2 gene.

This gene is a member of the STEAP family and encodes a multi-pass membrane protein that localizes to the Golgi complex, the plasma membrane, and the vesicular tubular structures in the cytosol. 

A highly similar protein in mouse has both ferri reductase and cupric reductase activity, and stimulates the cellular uptake of both iron and copper in vitro. Increased transcriptional expression of the human gene is associated with prostate cancer progression. Alternate transcriptional splice variants, encoding different isoforms, have been characterized.

References

Further reading